Diexia is a genus of beetle in the family Cerambycidae. Its only species is Diexia punctigera. It was described by Pascoe in 1865.

References

Pteropliini
Beetles described in 1865